Eyl District is a district in the northeastern Nugal region of Somalia. Its capital is Eyl.

Eyl is a part of the area of Puntland, which is a region of Somalia. It has been targeted by ISIS and other terroristic groups from 2015-2019 after being wiped out from Iraq.

It is currently controlled by the Somalian government.

References

External links
 Districts of Somalia
 Administrative map of Eyl District

Districts of Somalia

Nugal, Somalia